Melaleuca pomphostoma is a plant in the myrtle family, Myrtaceae, and is endemic to the south-west of Western Australia. It is a small, dense shrub with fleshy, narrow leaves, greenish-yellow flowers. It is similar and closely related to Melaleuca bracteosa but differs in the colour and number of stamens in each flower.

Description

They are greenish-yellow with the stamens arranged in five bundles around each flower, the bundles containing 11 to 18 stamens.

Melaleuca pomphostoma is similar to Melaleuca bracteosa but differs from it in having fewer stamens (M. bracteosa has 7 to 11 per bundle), a different leaf shape and distinctive, numerous, white raised stomata, which are barely visible with a hand lens, on the leaf blades.

Taxonomy and naming
Melaleuca pomphostoma was first formally described in 1992 by Bryan Barlow in Nuytsia as a new species. The specific epithet (pomphostoma) is from the Ancient Greek words pomphos meaning "a blister" and stoma meaning "mouth" referring to the raised stomata on the lower leaf surface.

Distribution and habitat
This melaleuca is confined to the Ravensthorpe district and the eastern end of the Fitzgerald River National Park in the Esperance Plains biogeographic region where it usually grows in sand or clayey loam

Conservation
Melaleuca pomphostoma is classified as "not threatened" by the Government of Western Australia Department of Parks and Wildlife.

References 

pomphostoma
Myrtales of Australia
Plants described in 1992
Endemic flora of Western Australia